Wainuia is a genus of air-breathing predatory land snails, terrestrial pulmonate gastropod molluscs in the family Rhytididae. Species in this genus occur in New Zealand.

Description 
The width of the shell of Wainuia is 21–38 mm.

Species
Species within the genus Wainuia include:
 Wainuia clarki (Powell, 1936), North Island
 Wainuia edwardi (Suter, 1899), South Island
 Wainuia fallai (Powell, 1946), South Island
 Wainuia urnula
 Wainuia urnula urnula (Pfeiffer, 1855), North Island
 Wainuia urnula nasuta (Powell, 1946), D'Urville Island

Ecology 
Species of the genus Wainuia are carnivorous.

Wainuia have eggs with a calcareous surface which lacks cuticle.

References

 Checklist of New Zealand Mollusca
 New Zealand Department of Conservation

Further reading 
 Efford M. G. 1998 Distribution and status of native carnivorous land snails in the genera Wainuia and Rhytida. Science for Conservation 101: 1–47.

Rhytididae
Taxa named by Arthur William Baden Powell